Micromeria graeca is a plant species in the family Lamiaceae.

Sources

References 

graeca